Candelo railway station is a railway station serving the comune of Candelo, in the Piedmont region, northwestern Italy. The station is located on the Santhià–Biella railway. The train services are operated by Trenitalia.

The station is currently managed by Rete Ferroviaria Italiana (RFI), a subsidiary of Ferrovie dello Stato (FS), Italy's state-owned rail company.

History
The station was opened on 8 September 1856, upon the inauguration of the Santhià–Biella railway. It was originally equipped with three tracks.

From 10 July 1951, with the end of the concession to the "Società Strade Ferrate di Biella (SFB)" company, the management of the railway line passed to the state and the exercise of the stations was assumed by Ferrovie dello Stato.

From 2006 the station was declassified to a railway stop, and remains in operation, but with only one track and one platform.

In the year 2000, the plant management passed to Rete Ferroviaria Italiana, which is classified in the category "Bronze".

Train services
The station is served by the following service(s):

Regional services (Treno regionale) Santhià - Biella San Paolo only on weekends and holidays

See also

 History of rail transport in Italy
 List of railway stations in Piedmont
 Rail transport in Italy
 Railway stations in Italy

References

External links

Railway stations in Piedmont
Railway stations opened in 1856